The Helosciomyzidae are a small family of flies - 9 genera and 22 species.
All are known from the Southern Hemisphere. With the exception of the South American genus Sciogriphoneura, the family occurs in Australia, New Zealand.
Little is known of their biology.

Classification
Cobergius Barnes, 1981
C. vittata (Macquart, 1851)
Dasysciomyza Barnes, 1981
D. setuligera (Malloch, 1922)
D. pseudosetuligera (Tonnoir & Malloch, 1928)
Eurotocus Steyskal in Steyskal & Knutson, 1979
E. australis Steyskal in Steyskal & Knutson, 1979
Helosciomyza Hendel, 1917
H. fuscinervis (Macquart, 1851)
H. anaxantha Steyskal in Steyskal & Knutson, 1979
H. australica Steyskal in Steyskal & Knutson, 1979
H. ferruginea Hendel, 1917
H. macalpinei Steyskal in Steyskal & Knutson, 1979
H. subalpina Tonnoir & Malloch, 1928
Napaeosciomyza Barnes, 1981
N. rara (Hutton, 1901)
N. spinicosta (Malloch, 1922)
N. subspinicosta (Tonnoir & Malloch, 1928)
Neosciomyza Barnes, 1981
N. anhecta (Steyskal in Steyskal & Knutson, 1979)
N. luteipennis (Steyskal in Steyskal & Knutson, 1979)
Polytocus Lamb, 1909
P. luteipennis Harrison, 1976
P. luteipennis Lamb, 1909
Scordalus Barnes, 1981
S. femoratus (Tonnoir & Malloch, 1928)
Xenosciomyza Tonnoir & Malloch, 1928
X. prima Tonnoir & Malloch, 1928
X. turbotti Harrison, 1955

References

Brachycera families
Sciomyzoidea